The 1975 Cork Senior Hurling Championship was the 87th staging of the Cork Senior Hurling Championship since its establishment by the Cork County Board in 1887. The championship began on 13 April 1975 and ended on 14 September 1975.

St. Finbarr's entered the championship as the defending champions, however, they were beaten by Seandún in the quarter-finals.

The final was played on 14 September 1975 at the Mardyke Grounds in Cork, between Blackrock and Glen Rovers, in what was their first meeting in the final in two years. Blackrock won the match by 4-11 to 0-10 to claim their 26th championship title overall and a first title in two years.

Paddy O'Sullivan and Pat Horgan were the championship's joint-top scorers.

Team changes

To Championship

Promoted from the Cork Intermediate Hurling Championship
 Bandon

Results

First round

Second round

Quarter-finals

Semi-finals

Final

Scoring statistics

Top scorers overall

Top scorers in a single game

Miscellaneous

 Seandún qualify for the semi-final for the first time since 1960.

References

Cork Senior Hurling Championship
Cork Senior Hurling Championship